The Trinity River is a  river, the longest with a watershed entirely within the U.S. state of Texas. It rises in extreme northern Texas, a few miles south of the Red River. The headwaters are separated by the high bluffs on the southern side of the Red River.

Indigenous peoples call the northern sections Arkikosa and the parts closer to the coast Daycoa. French explorer Robert Cavelier de La Salle, in 1687, named it Riviere des canoës ("River of Canoes").  In 1690 Spanish explorer Alonso de León named the river "La Santísima Trinidad" ("the Most Holy Trinity"), in the Spanish Catholic practice of memorializing places by religious references.

Course 

The Trinity River has four branches: the West Fork, the Clear Fork, the Elm Fork, and the East Fork.

The West Fork Trinity River has its headwaters in Archer County.  From there it flows southeast, through the man-made reservoirs Lake Bridgeport and Eagle Mountain Lake, and eastward through Lake Worth and the city of Fort Worth.

The Clear Fork Trinity River begins north of Weatherford, Texas, and flows southeastward through Lake Weatherford and Benbrook Lake reservoirs. It flows northeastward, where it joins the West Fork near downtown Fort Worth and continues as the West Fork.

The Elm Fork Trinity River flows south from near Gainesville through Ray Roberts Lake and east of the city of Denton, eventually through Lewisville Lake.

The West Fork and the Elm Fork merge as they enter the city of Dallas.

The East Fork Trinity River (on old maps the Bois d'Arc River) begins near McKinney, Texas, and flows through Lavon Lake and then Lake Ray Hubbard before joining the Trinity River just southeast of Dallas.

The Trinity flows southeast from Dallas across a fertile floodplain and the pine forests of eastern Texas. This area gained in population during the period of the Republic of Texas; it had not been extensively settled by Mexican residents before that, although many Tejanas have deep roots here. The Trinity crosses Texas State Highway 31 in Henderson County, near where the first county seat, Buffalo, was established.

The river empties into Trinity Bay, an arm of Galveston Bay that is an inlet of the Gulf of Mexico. Its river mouth is near the town of Anahuac, southeast of Houston.

Tributaries 
Clear Fork of the Trinity River
East Fork of the Trinity River (Bois d'Arc River)
Elm Fork of the Trinity River
West Fork of the Trinity River
Bachman Branch
Cedar Creek
 Mountain Creek
Fossil Creek (Texas)
Johnson Creek
Red Oak Creek
Richland Creek
White Rock Creek
Rowlett Creek
Big Creek
Fourmile Creek
Five Mile Creek
Ten Mile Creek
Sycamore Creek
Marine Creek

Public works projects 

Plans from the 1890s for a shipping channel along the length of the Trinity River were scrapped because it would have required extensive dredging to make the river navigable, although several overpasses were built with very high clearances in anticipation of the shipping channel.  Locks were actually built 13 miles downstream of Dallas in the early 1900s.  Original federal plans called for building 36 locks and dams from Trinity Bay near Houston to Dallas. The first built was Lock and Dam No. 1 in the city of Dallas at McCommas Bluff, directly west of Lincoln Memorial Cemetery. Lock construction came to a standstill in the wake of World War I, however. Only Lock and Dam Nos. 1, 2, 4, 6, 7, 20 and 25 were built. There are currently no plans for addressing these old locks located in various spots along the Trinity River. However, the Corps is working nearby on the Dallas Floodway Extension Project. The DFE Project is under construction and is helping to fulfill their mission, as directed by Congress in cooperation with the city of Dallas. It is helping to lower flood risk, and provide ecosystem restoration and recreation to the citizens of Dallas.

The Trinity River Corridor Project is intended to transform the Trinity River flood zone in downtown Dallas into the nation's largest urban park, featuring three signature bridges designed by acclaimed architect Santiago Calatrava.

A similar project is planned by the Tarrant Regional Water District, City of Fort Worth, Tarrant County, Streams & Valleys Inc., and U.S. Army Corps of Engineers to develop an area north of "downtown" as "uptown" along the Trinity River. This plan promotes a large mixed-use development adjacent to the central city area of Fort Worth, with a goal to prevent urban sprawl by promoting the growth of a healthy, vibrant urban core. The Trinity River Vision lays the groundwork to enable Fort Worth's central business district to double in size over the next forty years.

Floods and flood protection 

Major flooding occurred on the Trinity River in the years 1844, 1866, 1871, and 1890, but a major event in the spring of 1908 set in motion the harnessing of the river. Five people died, 4,000 were left homeless, and property damage was estimated at $2.5 million.

Dallas was without power for three days, all telephone and telegraph service was down, and rail service was canceled. The only way to reach Oak Cliff was by boat. West Dallas was hit harder than any other part of the city—the Dallas Times Herald said "indescribable suffering" plagued the area. Much to the horror of residents, thousands of livestock drowned in the flood and some became lodged in the tops of trees. The stench of their decay hung over the city as the water subsided.

After the disastrous flood, the city's citizenry wanted to find a way to control the unpredictable Trinity River and to build a bridge linking Oak Cliff and Dallas. The immediate reaction was clamor to build an indestructible, all-weather crossing over the Trinity. This had already been tried following the 1890 flood; the result was the "Long Wooden Bridge" that connected Jefferson Boulevard in Oak Cliff and Cadiz in Dallas, but the resulting unstable bridge was easily washed away by the 1908 flood. George B. Dealey, publisher of the Dallas Morning News, proposed a  concrete bridge based on the design of a bridge crossing the Missouri River in Kansas City. Ultimately, a US$650,000 (US$ in today's terms) bond election was approved and in 1912, the Oak Cliff Viaduct (now the Houston Street Viaduct) was opened with festivities that drew 58,000 spectators. At that time, the bridge was the longest concrete structure in the world.

Following from the 1908 flooding, levees were first constructed in 1932. They were heightened in 1960 to the 30 ft that has been maintained to the early 21st century. Current plans to improve the existing levees are part of what is known as the Dallas Floodway Extension project and the Trinity River Project.  They entail extending two existing levees and raising two others, all adjacent to the downtown Dallas area.

Downtown Dallas also suffered severe flooding in 1990.  Minor flooding of the Trinity River occurs frequently, such as, for instance, in the spring of 2015 and summer of 2022.

See also 

 Atakapa
 List of longest rivers of the United States (by main stem)
 List of the ten longest Texas rivers
 List of Texas rivers
 Trinidad, Texas
 Trinity River Authority
 Trinity River National Wildlife Refuge
 Trinity River Vision Project
 Trinity, Texas

References

External links 

 Trinity River Corridor Project (City of Dallas)
 Trinity River Vision (City of Fort Worth)
 Plans for a shipping channel along the length of the Trinity River
 
 
 
 Historic photos of Corps of Engineers lock and dam projects throughout Texas in 1910–20s from the Portal to Texas History
 Map of the planned Dallas park system.
 
 Galveston Bay Foundation—The Trinity River provides half the freshwater inflows into Galveston Bay, one of the most important and productive estuaries in the United States

 
Rivers of Texas
Rivers of Archer County, Texas
Rivers of Jack County, Texas
Rivers of Cooke County, Texas
Rivers of Wise County, Texas
Rivers of Parker County, Texas
Rivers of Denton County, Texas
Rivers of Tarrant County, Texas
Rivers of Collin County, Texas
Rivers of Dallas County, Texas
Rivers of Dallas
Rivers of Rockwall County, Texas
Rivers of Ellis County, Texas
Rivers of Kaufman County, Texas
Rivers of Navarro County, Texas
Rivers of Henderson County, Texas
Rivers of Freestone County, Texas
Rivers of Anderson County, Texas
Rivers of Leon County, Texas
Rivers of Houston County, Texas
Rivers of Madison County, Texas
Rivers of Trinity County, Texas
Rivers of Walker County, Texas
Rivers of Polk County, Texas
Rivers of San Jacinto County, Texas
Rivers of Liberty County, Texas
Rivers of Chambers County, Texas
Rivers of Houston
Galveston Bay Area
Drainage basins of the Gulf of Mexico